Maharishi Markandeshwar University, Solan (MMU Solan) is a private university located in the village Laddo near Kumarhatti, in Solan district, Himachal Pradesh, India. The university was established in 2010 by the Maharishi Markandeshwar University Trust (MMUT) through the Maharishi Markandeshwar University (Establishment & Regulation) Act, 2010. Other institutes under MMUT include Maharishi Markandeshwar University, Mullana and Maharishi Markandeshwar University, Sadopur.

Approval
Like all universities in India, Indus International University is recognised by the University Grants Commission (UGC).

References

External links

Education in Solan district
Universities in Himachal Pradesh
Educational institutions established in 2010
2010 establishments in Himachal Pradesh
Private universities in India